Porgera (also spelled Pogera) is a town in Enga Province, Papua New Guinea. It lies to the east of Porgera Gold Mine.  It is administered under Porgera Rural LLG.

Populated places in Enga Province